Ray is a masculine given name and short form (hypocorism) of Raymond, and may refer to:

Politics
 Ray Aguilar (born 1947), Nebraska state senator
 Ray Aguilera, Pueblo, Colorado City council member
 Ray Ahipene-Mercer (born 1948), New Zealand city councillor in Wellington
 Ray Gosling (1939–2013), British gay rights activist
 Ray Groom (born 1944), Australian lawyer, sportsman and politician
 Ray LaHood (born 1945), American politician
 Ray Liberti, American politician
 Ray Mabus (born 1948), American politician, Secretary of the Navy and former Governor of Mississippi
 Ray Martin (politician) (born 1941), Canadian politician, former leader of the Alberta New Democratic Party
 Ray Mattox (1927–2005), American politician
 Ray Price (speechwriter) (born 1930), President Richard Nixon's chief speechwriter
 Ray Alexander Simons (1914–2004), South African communist and trade unionist
 Ray Tarver (1921–1972), American dentist and politician
 Ray Whitney (politician) (1930–2012), UK politician
 Ray Wyatt, American politician

Music
 Ray Abrams (musician) (1920–1992), American jazz and jump blues tenor saxophonist
 Ray Alexander (musician) (1925–2002), American jazz drummer and vibraphonist
 Ray Anderson (musician) (born 1952), American jazz trombone and trumpet player
 Ray Anthony (born 1922), American bandleader, trumpeter, songwriter and actor
 Ray Boltz (born 1953), American Christian singer-songwriter
 Ray Brown Jr. (born 1949), American jazz and blues pianist and singer
 Ray Brown (musician) (1926–2002), American jazz double bassist
 Ray Bryant (1931–2011), American jazz pianist, composer
 Ray Charles (1930–2004), American singer, songwriter, musician and composer
 Ray Charles (musician, born 1918) (1918–2015), American musician, leader of The Ray Charles Singers
 Ray Chen (born 1989), Taiwanese-American violinist
 Ray Conniff (1916–2002), American bandleader and arranger
 Ray Dalton (born 1991), American singer-songwriter
 Ray Davies (born 1944), English rhythm guitarist, vocalist and songwriter for The Kinks
 Ray Davis (musician) (1940–2005), member of The Parliaments, Parliament, Funkadelic, and The Temptations
 Ray Dorset (born 1946), British guitarist, singer, and founding member of Mungo Jerry
 Ray Fisher (singer) (1940–2011), Scottish folk singer
 Ray Griff (1940–2016), Canadian country music singer-songwriter
 Ray Hedges, English songwriter and record producer
 Ray Heindorf (1908–1980), American songwriter, composer, conductor, and arranger
 Ray Isaac (singer), Australian singer
 Ray LaMontagne (born 1973), American singer-songwriter
 Ray Lewis, American rhythm and blues singer and member of The Drifters
 Ray Luzier (born 1970), American drummer
 Ray Manzarek (1939–2013), American musician, singer, producer, film director and author, best known as a founding member and keyboardist of The Doors
 Ray Martin (orchestra leader) (1918–1988), British-Austrian orchestra leader born Kurt Kohn
 Ray Parker Jr. (born 1954), American guitarist, singer, songwriter and producer
 Ray Pennington (1933–2020), American country music singer-songwriter
 Ray Peterson (1939–2005), American pop singer
 Ray Price (musician) (1926–2013), American country singer-songwriter and guitarist
 Ray Sawyer (1937–2018), American singer, founding member of Dr. Hook & the Medicine Show
 Ray Thomas (1941–2018), English flautist, singer-songwriter, founding member of The Moody Blues
 Ray Toro (born 1977), American rock guitarist

Sports
 Ray Abruzzese (1937–2011), American college and football player
 Ray Adduono (born 1947), Canadian ice hockey player
 Ray Agnew (born 1967), American National Football League player
 Ray Alexander (gridiron football) (born 1962), American National Football League and Canadian Football League player
 Ray Allen (born 1975), American National Basketball Association player
 Ray Allison (born 1959), Canadian National Hockey League player
 Ray Amm (1927–1955), Rhodesian motorcycle racer
 Ray Amoo, Nigerian boxer of the 1970s and 1980s
 Ray Anderson (boxer) (born 1944), American light heavyweight boxer
 Ray Austin (boxer) (born 1970), American boxer
 Ray Austin (American football) (born 1974), American National Football League player
 Ray Bourque (born 1960), Canadian National Hockey League player
 Ray Brown (offensive lineman) (born 1962), American National Football League player
 Ray Brown (safety) (born 1949), American National Football League player
 Ray Brown (American football, born 1936), American National Football League quarterback
 Ray Brown (Negro leagues pitcher) (1908–1965), Negro league baseball pitcher 
 Ray Brown (rugby league) (born 1957), Australian rugby league footballer
 Ray Cillien (1939–1991), Luxembourg boxer
 Ray Emery (1982–2018), Canadian National Hockey League goaltender
 Ray Graves (1918–2015), American college football and National Football League player and college football coach
 Ray Guy (born 1949), American National Football League Hall-of-Fame punter
 Ray Hanken (1911–1980), American National Football League player
 Ray Harroun (1879–1968), American racecar driver
 Ray Isaac (American football), American football player
 Ray Illingworth (1932–2021), British cricketer
 Ray Jauch (born 1938), coach in the Canadian Football League, United States Football League and Arena Football League
 Ray Julian (born 1936), English cricketer
 Ray Lazdins (born 1964), Canadian discus thrower
 Sugar Ray Leonard (born 1956), American boxer
 Ray Lewis (born 1975), American National Football League player
 Ray Lewis (referee) (born 1944), English association football referee
 Ray Lewis (sprinter) (1910–2003), Canadian track-and-field sprinter
 Ray Mabbutt (1936–2016), English footballer
 Ray Martin (baseball) (1925–2013), American Major League Baseball pitcher
 Ray Martin (English footballer) (born 1945), English footballer
 Ray Martin (pool player) (born 1936), American pool player
 Ray Nitschke (1936–1998), American Hall-of-Fame National Football League player
 Ray Perkins (1941–2020), American football player and coach
 Ray Price (cricketer) (born 1976), Zimbabwean cricketer
 Ray Price (motorcyclist) (1937–2015), American motorcycle drag racer, designer and engineer
 Ray Price (rugby) (born 1953), Australian rugby union, and rugby league footballer of the 1970s and 1980s
 Raymell Ray Rice (born 1987), American National Football League player
 Sugar Ray Robinson (1921–1989), American Hall-of-Fame boxer born Walker Smith Jr.
 Ray Sefo (born 1971), New Zealand fight promoter and retired kickboxer, boxer, and mixed martial artist of Samoan descent
 Ray Tesser (1912–1982), American National Football League player
 Ray Voltz, American soccer goalkeeper
 Ray Wallace (footballer) (born 1969), English footballer
 Ray Wells (born 1980), American National Football League player
 Ray Whitney (ice hockey) (born 1972), Canadian National Hockey League player
 Ray Wilkins (born 1956), British footballer and football coach
 Ray Witter (1896–1983), American football player

Film and TV
 Ray Abruzzo (born 1954), American actor
 Ray Aghayan (1928–2011), Iranian-American costume designer in the film industry
 Ray Alan (1930–2010), English ventriloquist and television entertainer
 Ray Austin (director) (born 1932), British television director
 Ray Bolger (1904–1987), American actor, singer and dancer born Raymond Bulcao
 Ray Boyle (1923–2022), American film and television actor
 Ray Cokes (born 1958), English television presenter and video jockey
 Ray Combs (1956–1996), American comedian, actor and game show host
 Ray Fisher (born 1987), American actor, known for his role as Cyborg in the DCEU
 Ray Gallardo, American film director and cinematographer
 Ray Girardin (1935–2019), American film, stage, and television actor
 Ray June (1895–1958), American cinematographer
 Ray Kellogg (actor) (1919–1981), American film and television actor
 Ray Liotta (1954–2022), American film actor
 Ray MacDonald (born 1977), Thai actor, adventurer and television presenter
 Ray Martin (television presenter) (born 1944), Australian television presenter
 Ray Mears (born 1964), British TV personality and survival specialist
 Ray Milland (1907-1986), Welsh-American actor and film director
 Ray Park (born 1974), Scottish actor and martial artist
 Ray Porter, American actor
 Ray Quinn (born 1988), English actor
 Ray Reyes (1970–2021), Filipino-American singer and actor
 Ray Romano (born 1957), American actor, comedian and screenwriter
 Ray Stark (1915–2004), independent film producer
 Ray Stevens (born 1939), American country- and pop singer-songwriter and comedian
 Ray Stevenson (born 1964), Northern Irish actor
 Herman Raymond Walston (1914–2001), American character actor
 Ray Winstone (born 1957), British actor, notable for parts in gangster films
 Ray Wise (born 1947), American actor

Business
 Ray Anderson (entrepreneur) (1934–2011), founder and chairman of Interface Inc.
 Ray Davis (businessman), American billionaire businessman, chief executive officer of Energy Transfer Partners and owner of the Texas Rangers of Major League Baseball
 Ray Kroc (1902–1984), American businessman and philanthropist who built up the McDonald's Corporation

Academia
 Ray Allen Billington (1903–1981), American historian
 Ray Hyman (born 1928), American Professor Emeritus of Psychology at the University of Oregon, author, magician and critic of parapsychology
 Ray Kurzweil (born 1948), American author, computer scientist, inventor and futurist

Writing and journalism
 Ray Anderson (journalist), American reporter for The New York Times 
 Ray Bradbury (1920–2012), American fantasy, science fiction, horror and mystery writer
 Ray Galton (1930–2020), British scriptwriter
 Ray Marcano, American medical reporter and music critic
 Ray Martin (television presenter) (born 1944), Australian journalist

Other
 Raymond Affleck (1922–1989), Canadian architect
 Ray Brown (designer) (born 1959), Australian clothing designer
 Ray Comfort (born 1949), New Zealand-born Christian minister and evangelist
 Raymond G. Davis (1915–2003), US four-star general and recipient of the Medal of Honor
 Ray Eames (1912–1988), American artist, designer and filmmaker
 Ray Johnson (1927–1995), American artist
 Ray Jones (chaplain) (born 1934), Anglican priest
 Ray Lewis (youth worker) (born 1963), Guyanese-born youth worker and former deputy mayor of London
 Ray Navarro (1964–1990), American artist, filmmaker, and HIV/AIDS activist
 Ray William Johnson (born 1981), American YouTube comedian

Fictional characters 
 Ray (The Promised Neverland), a main character in the manga series The Promised Neverland
 Ray Molina, from Netflix's Julie and the Phantoms
 Ray Machowski, a character in the Grand Theft Auto III and also appeared in Grand Theft Auto Liberty City Stories

See also
 Rae (given name)

English masculine given names
Masculine given names
Hypocorisms